Fly Pro (legally CA "Fly Pro" SRL) is a Moldovan cargo charter airline established in November 2016 based at Chișinău International Airport.

Destinations
Fly Pro operates chartered cargo services on various routes throughout the Middle East and Asia.

Fleet

As of February 2023, Fly Pro operates the following leased cargo aircraft:

This aircraft is capable of carrying up to 112 tonnes of freight.

See also
List of airlines of Moldova

References

External links

Airlines of Moldova
Airlines established in 2016
Cargo airlines of Moldova